Kumkumapoovu is an Indian Malayalam-language soap opera that aired on Asianet from 2011 to 2014. It ran for 785 episodes. The cast included Asha Sharath, Sajan Surya, Shelly Kishore, Shanavas Shanu, Aswathy, G.K Pillai and Rindhya.

The serial won several awards at the Asianet Television Awards including Best Serial 2012, Best Script for 2012,2013 and 2014, Best Actor for Sajan Surya in 2012 and 2013, Best Actress for Asha Sarath and Shelly in 2012 and 2013 respectively.

Plot
Jayanthi and her illegitimate daughter Shalini were separated at Shalini's birth, with Jayanthi misled into believing her daughter had died while the girl was raised for a time by a butcher, Markose, who treated her unkindly.  Rescued from the unkind butcher, Shalini was raised in a home with a foster brother, Mahesh. When Mahesh marries the legitimate daughter of Jayanthi, Amala, Jayanthi realizes who Shalini is. Jayanthi must come to terms with her feelings about the daughter she believed dead.

Cast
 Main Lead roles
 Asha Sarath as Professor Jayanthi Prabhakaran
 Shelly Kishore as Shalini, Jayanthi's illegitimate daughter 
 Sajan Surya as Mahesh, Amala's husband
 Shanavas Shanu as Rudhran, Shalini's husband
 Aswathy Thomas as Amala Mahesh, Jayathi's daughter
 GK Pillai as Colonel Jagannatha Varma, Jayanthi's father
 Lishoy as Prabhakaran (Prabha), Jayanthi's husband
 Amith as Writer Jithan, Shalini's father
 Supporting cast
 Kalaranjini as Subhadramma (Athimuttathamma)
 Indira Thampi as Vasantha [Jayanthi's mother]
 T.S Raju as Markose
 Vijayakumari as Mariamma Markose
 Jayakrishnan Kichu/ Pratheesh Nandhan as Arun Prabhakaran [Jayanthi's son]
Sona Jelina as Karthika Mahesh [Daughter of Mahesh and Amala]
 Santhosh Kurup as CI Jayapalan
 Devendranath as Aadhi/Adithyan (Antagonist)
 Yadhu Krishnan as Adarsh (Antagonist)

 Dharmambigai Rindhya as Karuna Arun [a.k.a Ammini]
Amboori Jayan as Govindan
 Anjana Haridas as Chithra Arun
Illekettu namboothiri as Sathyasheelan
 Haridas Varkala
 Rajeev Roshan as Anand
 Vimal Raj as Kazhukan Shaji
 Chitra Iyer as Jithans friend
 Vanitha Krishnachandran as Professor Rajalakshmi
 Bijoy Varghese
 Sreeya Remesh  as  Meera
 Yamuna Mahesh as Advocate
 Kallayam Krishadas
 Karthika Kannan as Kanchana

Awards
5th Asianet Television awards 2012
Best Serial - G Jayakumar Bhavachithra (Ross petal entertainment . Pvt.Ltd)
Best Director -Praveen Kadakkavoor
Best Screenplay-Pradeep Panicker
Best Actor - Sajan Surya as Mahesh
Best Actress - Asha Sarath as Pro. Jayanthi
Best Debut - Shelly as Shalini
Most Popular Actor - Shanavas as Rudhran
Best Dubbing Artist - Bhagyalakshmi for Prof. Jayanthi
Best Actor in a negative role (Female)- Ashwathy as Amala
Best Character Actor - T.S.Saju as Markose
Best Cinematographer -Hemachandran
Best Music Director- Rony Rapheal for Oru Thaaratin eenam Pole
Best lyrics - Prayaar Geethamohan
Best editor - Rohit Roshan
Special Jury - Haimambika Rindhya as Karuna
Lifetime Achievement Awards-GK Pilla

6th Asianet Television Awards 2013
Evergreen Hit serial - Kumkumapoovu
Best Actor -Sajan Surya as Mahesh
Best Actress -Shelly as Shalini
Best Screenplay-Pradeep Panicker
Golden star of the year- Asha Sarath as Pro. Jayanthi
Best Actor in a negative role (Female)- Ashwathy as Amala
Best Actor in a negative role (Female) Spl. Jury- Haimambika Rindhya as Karuna
Best Actor in a negative role (male)- Devendranath
Background score- Sanand George
Best Dubbing Artist Male - Shobi Thilakan for Jithan
Best Dubbing Artist Female - Devi S. for Amala
Best editor - Rohit Roshan
7th Asianet Television Awards 2014
Best Screenplay- Pradeep Panicker
Best editor - Rohit Roshan
Asiavision Television awards 2013
2013-Best Actress (Asha)
2013-Best serial
2013-Best Negative Actress (Aswathy)
Asiavision Television Awards 2014
2014-Best Actress (Shelly)
2014-Golden star (Asha)
2014- Popular Actor (Shanavas)

Adaptations

References

Malayalam-language television shows
Asianet (TV channel) original programming